Timothy Gerard Mayza (born January 15, 1992) is an American professional baseball pitcher for the Toronto Blue Jays of Major League Baseball (MLB). He made his MLB debut in 2017.

High school and college
Mayza played baseball, basketball, and soccer for Upper Perkiomen High School in Red Hill, Pennsylvania. As a sophomore, he threw a no-hitter. In his final high school season, Mayza pitched to a 5–3 win–loss record, 2.73 earned run average (ERA), and 53 strikeouts in 51 innings pitched. He signed a letter of intent to attend Millersville University of Pennsylvania in November 2009. In 2012, he played collegiate summer baseball with the Cotuit Kettleers of the Cape Cod Baseball League. In his final year with Millersville, Mayza posted an 11–3 record, 1.55 ERA, and 91 strikeouts in 98 innings.

Professional career
Mayza was drafted by the Toronto Blue Jays in the 12th round of the 2013 Major League Baseball draft. He received a $100,000 signing bonus and was assigned to the Rookie-level Gulf Coast League Blue Jays to begin his professional career. After three appearances in the Gulf Coast League, Mayza was promoted to the Rookie Advanced Bluefield Blue Jays of the Appalachian League. Mayza made 13 total appearances in 2013 and posted a 1–4 record, 7.76 ERA, and 27 strikeouts in 29 innings pitched. In 2014, he split time between Bluefield and the Short Season-A Vancouver Canadians. In 26 innings, Mayza worked to a 2–4 record, 6.75 ERA, and 20 strikeouts.

Mayza pitched the entire 2015 season with the Class-A Lansing Lugnuts. He made 26 appearances for the Lugnuts, and posted a 3–2 record, 3.07 ERA, and 62 strikeouts in 55 innings pitched. Mayza continued to progress through the Blue Jays organization, beginning the 2016 season with the Advanced-A Dunedin Blue Jays. In June, he earned a promotion to the Double-A New Hampshire Fisher Cats, where he finished the year. Mayza made a career-high 42 pitching appearances in 2016 and went 3–3 with a 2.25 ERA and 65 strikeouts in 64 total innings. On January 19, 2017, Mayza was invited to Major League spring training. He was assigned to Double-A New Hampshire to begin the 2017 season. After 29 appearances, Mayza was promoted to the Triple-A Buffalo Bisons. He made 11 relief appearances, posting a 0.93 ERA, before his first promotion to the Majors.

On August 14, 2017, Mayza was called up by the Blue Jays. He made his major league debut on August 15, pitching a scoreless 9th inning in a 6–4 loss to the Tampa Bay Rays and recording his first major league strikeout against Peter Bourjos. Mayza was credited with his first major league win on September 12, when he pitched the bottom half of the 9th inning before the Blue Jays walked off the Baltimore Orioles 3–2.

Mayza split the 2018 season between the major leagues and the Buffalo Bisons. In 37 games for the Blue Jays, he posted a 2–0 record with a 3.28 ERA and 40 strikeouts over 35 innings.

On September 13, 2019, in the 10th inning in a game against the New York Yankees, Mayza threw a pitch behind Didi Gregorius and immediately crumpled to the ground in pain. The next day, it was revealed he had torn his UCL and would undergo Tommy John surgery. Mayza was outrighted off the Blue Jays roster on November 20, 2019. He spent all of 2020 recovering from the surgery.

On April 1, 2021, Mayza was selected to the 40-man roster. That year he recorded a 3.40 ERA and 57 strikeouts in 53 innings.

On September 28, 2022, Mayza gave up Aaron Judge’s 61st home run, tying an American League record.

On January 13, 2023, Mayza signed a one-year, $2.1 million contract with the Blue Jays, avoiding salary arbitration.

Personal life
Mayza is the eldest of four children born to Jerry and Marlene Mayza. His father played NCAA Division III basketball for Allentown College, and his sister Deanna plays basketball for the University of Hartford.

References

External links

1992 births
Living people
American expatriate baseball players in Canada
Baseball players from Pennsylvania
Bluefield Blue Jays players
Buffalo Bisons (minor league) players
Cotuit Kettleers players
Dunedin Blue Jays players
Gulf Coast Blue Jays players
Lansing Lugnuts players
Major League Baseball pitchers
Mesa Solar Sox players
Millersville Marauders baseball players
New Hampshire Fisher Cats players
Toronto Blue Jays players
Vancouver Canadians players